Grason may refer to:

Grason Makara (born 2000), Australian rugby union player 
C. Gus Grason (1881–1953), judge of the Maryland Court of Appeals
Richard Grason, judge of the Maryland Court of Appeals
William Grason (1788–1868), 25th Governor of Maryland
Gräsön, a former island in the Swedish sector of the Bay of Bothnia that is now the Western part of Hindersön

See also
Grayson (disambiguation)